A referendum on abolishing the monarchy was held in the Kingdom of Sikkim on 14 April 1975. It was approved by 97.55% of voters, and resulted in the country becoming an Indian state.

Background
Sikkim had been a protectorate of India during the British colonial rule since the 19th century. The arrangement was continued after India's independence through a treaty in 1950, by which India assumed responsibility for communications, defence and foreign affairs, as well as the "territorial integrity" of Sikkim. Sikkim had autonomy in internal affairs. The April 1974 general elections resulted in a victory for the India-friendly Sikkim National Congress. The new government sought an increase in civil and political liberties, but was suppressed by the Chogyal, Palden Thondup Namgyal. In May it passed the Government of Sikkim Act, which provided for responsible government and furthering relations with India, and on 4 July 1974 the Parliament adopted a new constitution that provided for the country becoming a state of India, which the Chogyal signed under pressure from India.

On 4 September 1974, the Indian Lok Sabha voted in favour of making Sikkim an "associate" state, with the Rajya Sabha voting for an amendment on 8 September, giving it a status equal to that of other Indian states and absorbing it in the Indian Union. On 8 September 1974 the Chogyal called for a free and fair referendum.

On 5 March 1975 the National Congress repeated its calls for integration into India, whilst the Chogyal again called for a referendum. On 9 April Indian troops entered the country, disarmed the palace guard (killing one of them and injuring four others) and surrounded the palace, putting the king under house-arrest. On 10 April 1975 the Sikkim State Council, with the support of Indian Prime Minister Indira Gandhi, unanimously voted to abolish the monarchy and merge with India in order to obtain full Indian statehood. A referendum on this issue was set for 14 April.

Results

The results of the  plebiscite were questioned by Sunanda K. Datta-Ray, who argued that "it took at least two days by jeep, the fastest mode of transport, to reach some of these inaccessible habitations, and it just would not have been physically possible to complete arrangements, hold the polls and count votes between 11 and 15 April."

Supporters of the Chogyal maintain that 70 to 80% of voters were outsiders from India.

Aftermath
After the declaration of the results, Sikkim's chief minister Kazi Lhendup Dorji cabled the results of the referendum to Indira Gandhi and asked her "to make an immediate response and accept the decision" to which she responded by saying that the Indian government would introduce a constitutional amendment in Parliament that would allow the kingdom to become part of India constitutionally.

The Indian Parliament gave its final approval to the constitutional amendment making Sikkim a state on 26 April 1975. On 15 May 1975 Indian President Fakhruddin Ali Ahmed ratified a constitutional amendment that made Sikkim the 22nd state of India and abolished the position of the Chogyal.

Reactions
China and Pakistan called the referendum a farce and a disguise for the forced annexation of the principality, to which Indira Gandhi replied by reminding them of their takeover of Tibet and the issue of Azad Kashmir, which she believed was Indian territory, respectively. The Chogyal called the referendum "illegal and unconstitutional".

The U.S. government viewed the merging of Sikkim into India as a historic and practical inevitability, given the state's location on important trade routes. The Soviet Union responded positively, though with a muted response. In 1978, Gandhi's successor, Prime Minister Morarji Desai, expressed regret and criticised the annexation of Sikkim, which along with increasing inflation led to violent protests against him by youth wing of the Indian National Congress. While Desai said the annexation was "not a desirable step" and bemoaned the fact he could not undo it, he also claimed "most of the people there wanted it" due to the unpopularity of the Chogyal.

See also
Sikkim: Requiem for a Himalayan Kingdom

References

History of Sikkim
Sikkim
Monarchy
Indira Gandhi administration
Referendums in Sikkim
Sikkim monarchy
Monarchy referendums
Sikkim
Invasions by India